Deepa Shree Niraula (दिपाश्री निरौला) is Nepalese artist, comedian, and radio personality best known for her role in the Nepali television serial Tito Satya. She is also known for her role in the comedy film series Chakkapanja'.  She is the director of the Nepali film franchise Chhakka Panja, and was a permanent guest in the first season of Mundre Ko Comedy Club.

Education
She has an intermediate level education from Mahendra Morang Campus affiliated to the Tribhuwan University in Biratnagar.

 Acting career 
Deepa started her acting career through Tharu Cinema, working as lead role in Hatai Kuhira, which is filmed in Tharu languages. Then she made her debut in Nepali cinema and television serial Tito Satya.
She has acted in the Sanskrit language film Raag-Biragam''.

Films
Sundar Mero Naam, 
Naso
Gaule
Sukumbasi
Surakshya
Ghar-Sansar
Chamatkar
Pareli
Chalachitra
Chandani
Aawara
Chautari
Woda no 6 
Khar ko Chano
Chakka panja 1 (Guest appearance)
Chakka panja 2 (Guest appearance)
Chakka panja 3

Television shows 

 Tityo Satya as Deepa
 Mundre Ko Comedy Club as Permanent guest
 Comedy Club with Champions as Permanent guest

Tele-films
Aagni-path
Chemeki
Sanahi roi rahecha
Paribhasa
Hile Dashain
Abiral Bagda cha Indrawati
Prayaschit
Aasha ko Diyo
Bigyapan
Fulwa
Tai chup Mai chup
Khadma ko Gaun
Devi
Santan
Parinam
Nepal ko Raj Parampara
Bis Minute
Jeevan- Yatra
Tulkee
Sankat
Malati
Bansha
Sangini

Ethnic Films
Badlaab in Bhojpuri 
Aagni-Path in Maithali
Kuhira in Tharu
Raag-Biragam in Sanskrit

References

External links

Nepalese television actresses
Nepalese film actresses
Actresses in Nepali cinema
Actresses in Nepali television
Living people
People from Biratnagar
Nepalese film directors
Nepalese women comedians
Nepalese child actresses
Nepalese women film directors
Nepalese women film producers
21st-century Nepalese screenwriters
21st-century Nepalese film directors
1975 births